Seal is an unincorporated community in Wyandot County, in the U.S. state of Ohio.

History
Settlement was made at Seal in 1850. A post office was established at Seal in 1850, and remained in operation until 1903.

References

Unincorporated communities in Wyandot County, Ohio
Unincorporated communities in Ohio
1850 establishments in Ohio